Dnyanprassarak Mandal's College and Research Center or DMC College Assagao, is a college located in the North Goa district's village of Assagao, is recognised by University Grants Commission (UGC), and is accredited by the NAAC with a Grade "A" (4th Cycle) and a score of 3.15/4.00. The college is ranked among the top 150 colleges of India under National Institutional Ranking Framework (NIRF) of Ministry of Human Resource Development (MHRD), Government of India.

History
The college was established as DM's V.N.S. Bandekar College of Commerce in 1974 by Dnyanprassarak Mandal an Educational trust which itself was established in 1908, in an attempt to fulfill the aspirations of many to acquire higher education. The college was formally affiliated to the University of Bombay, presently affiliated to Goa University. Dnyanprassarak Mandal, inducted Science and Arts faculties to its already diverse and dynamic educational portfolio from June 1996. From the academic year 2006-07, the college started the self-financed Bachelor of Business Administration (BBA), Bachelor of Computer Applications (BCA), Master of Commerce (M.com), and Master of Science in Pharmaceutical Chemistry (MSc) courses. From June 2012, the college has started a 'Research Center' in Commerce for undertaking Ph.D programme in Commerce, and Ph.D in Chemistry from June 2014.

Courses

Undergraduate
B.A. - Economics / History / English
B.Com. - Accounting/ Business Management/ Cost Management Accounting / Banking
B.Sc. - Chemistry
B.Sc. - Computer Science
B.Sc. - Electronics
B.Sc. - Geology
B.Sc. - Mathematics
Bachelor of Business Administrations
Bachelor of Computer Applications

Postgraduate
M.com.- Accounting/ Business Management/ Cost Management Accounting / Banking
M.Sc. - Pharmaceutical Chemistry & organic chemistry

Students council
The Student Council is an associated student body for the functioning of democracy. The Council comprises elected representatives of the students headed by General Secretary, Gymkhana Secretary, Class Representative. The members of the  council are elected by the college's bonafide students or can also be nominated by the college.

Campus
The college is Located in Assagao, a kilometer away from Mapusa city and is well connected by road transport. The land is donated by the Assagao Communidade. college has one athletic ground and an indoor gymnasium.

Library
College is equipped with well structured Library which has closed access system and is open for eight hours a day without break form 8.30 AM to 4.30 PM, having a seating capacity of hundred students at a time with separate seating for staff. Library subscribes to more than sixty academic Journals and magazines, and twenty one National Newspapers including English, Konkani and Marathi. library has a number of reading materials including fiction, non-fiction, reference books, text books in print and non print materials, The library is equipped with Wi-Fi broadband connectivity and computerised library operations. Annual Book Fair is organised every year with four scholastic book fairs form different publishing houses.

Sports
College has a football/cricket ground and indoor Gymnasium which provides its student with best opportunities to develop their personality through participation in various games. College has excelled in most of the games at National and State levels and has won many prominent tournaments and events in Cricket, Football, weight lifting, Chess, athletics.

Indoor and Outdoor Games
 
 Carrom
 Chess
 Table Tennis
 Badminton
 Weight Training
 Weight Lifting
 Power Lifting
 Cricket
 Football
 Athletics
 Volleyball
 Kabaddi
 Hockey
 Handball

Facilities Provided
 Parents Teachers Association
 Co-operative Society
 Audio-Visual Room And Conference Hall
 Internet
 Canteen
 Common Room For Girls
 First-Aid
 Anti-Ragging Committee
 National Service Scheme (NSS)
 National Cadet corps (NCC)

See also
Assagao
Assagao Union High School
St. Xavier's College, Mapusa, Goa

External Reference

References 

Universities and colleges in Goa
1974 establishments in Goa, Daman and Diu
Education in North Goa district
Educational institutions established in 1974